Meon Valley Trail may refer to:

 Meon Valley Trail (cycle trail), a  circular trail for cyclists in Hampshire, England
 Meon Valley Trail (footpath), an  bridleway section of the Meon Valley Trail in Hampshire, England

See also
Meon Valley Railway